William J. Brennan High School is the tenth public high school in the Northside Independent School District of San Antonio, Texas, United States. It is a four-year high school that opened in 2010 and graduated its first senior class in June 2012. In 2017, the school was rated "Met Standard" by the Texas Education Agency, with a 2-Star Distinction for Academic Achievements in Top 25 Percent Student Progress and Postsecondary Readiness.

Area served
Brennan serves all areas west of Loop 1604 from just south of the Alamo Ranch neighborhoods west to the Medina County–Bexar County line near Texas State Highway 211 (Hill Country Parkway), extending south to near Marbach Road and its intersection at Grosenbacher Road. The far west areas of San Antonio, Texas, are experiencing rapid growth and Brennan alleviated overcrowded conditions at neighboring William Howard Taft High School and John Paul Stevens High School.

Namesake
As with all the high schools in the Northside Independent School District, it was named after a United States Supreme Court Justice, William J. Brennan. Brennan was appointed by President Eisenhower in 1956 and retired in 1990. He died in 1997 at the age of 91.

Athletics
The Brennan Bears compete in these sports - 

Baseball
Basketball
Cross Country
Football
Golf
Soccer
Softball
Swimming and Diving
Tennis
Track and Field
Volleyball
Marching Band

Football
In the 2013–2014 school year, the football team advanced to the Class 4A Division 1 state championship football game and played Denton Guyer High School from Denton, Texas. The game was played in Arlington, Texas, at AT&T Stadium. Brennan fell short 31–14 and received the title of state runner-up with a 15–1 season record.

Feeder schools
Brennan is fed by Luna, Briscoe, and Bernal middle schools, which are fed by elementary schools Behlau, Galm, Mireles, Hoffman, Langley, Lieck, Gamez, and Ott.

Band
The Brennan Bear Band is under the direction of Thomas Kober with assistant directors Mark Wolocki and Tim Briones. The Bear Band has consistently received 1's at UIL marching contest since the opening of the school in 2010.

2013-2014 - The band became the first 4A marching band in the Northside Independent School District to advance to the UIL state competition level. In the State of Texas (4A), the band placed 19th for their show, "Turning Points".

2014-2015 - The band competed in the 6A level with their show, "Mood Rings". The band received a first division in the UIL Region marching competition, advancing them to Area Prelims at Dub Faris Stadium in San Antonio. They performed first in Class 6A of the Area Marching Competition, where they fell short of a spot to Area Finals, placing 13th out of 20 bands competing for one of the ten Finals' spots.

2015-2016 - The band competed in the 6A division with their show, "Intergalactic". They received sweepstakes at the UIL Region Competition.

Notable alumni
George King – basketball player
Jordan Murphy (born 1997) – American-U.S. Virgin Islander basketball player in  the Israeli Basketball Premier League
Derick Roberson – American football linebacker for the Houston Texans of the National Football League (NFL)

References

External links
 Official website
 Twitter

Educational institutions established in 2010
High schools in San Antonio
2010 establishments in Texas
Public high schools in Bexar County, Texas
Northside Independent School District high schools